Gilbert Bezzina is a French violinist and conductor of baroque opera.

Gilbert Bezzina studied violin at the Conservatory of Nice and continues to perform and record as a violinist.

In 1965 he founded the “Société de Musique Ancienne de Nice”, and in 1982 the “Ensemble Baroque de Nice”, with which he has presented, and in some cases recorded, a series of revivals of baroque operas.

A selection of Bezzina's major opera revivals include:
 Vivaldi's L'incoronazione di Dario:  Gérard Lesne, Henri Ledroit, Dominique Visse, Michel Verschaeve, Isabelle Poulenard, dir. Gilbert Bezzina, recorded for Harmonia Mundi.
 2003 Vivaldi's Rosmira fedele, Opéra de Nice.
 2007 Handel's Teseo at the Opéra de Nice.

Bezzina also has revived oratorios:
 In 2007 Bezzina premiered a little-known second setting by Alessandro Scarlatti of La Giuditta in a mise en espace by Gilbert Blin.
 2009 Alessandro Scarlatti: Agar et Ismaele esiliati.

References

Classical Beast - We review classical musical instruments.

External links

Living people
People from Tunis
21st-century French male classical violinists
20th-century French male classical violinists
French male conductors (music)
21st-century French conductors (music)
Year of birth missing (living people)